Shiramin (also Romanized as Shīrāmīn and Shīr Amīn) is a village in Shiramin Rural District of Howmeh District, Azarshahr County, East Azerbaijan province, Iran. At the 2006 census, its population was 3,280 in 909 households. The following census in 2011 counted 3,406 people in 1,010 households. The latest census in 2016 showed a population of 3,282 people in 1,057 households; it was the largest village in its rural district.

References 

Azarshahr County

Populated places in East Azerbaijan Province

Populated places in Azarshahr County